National Route A019 is a beltway road around the city of Córdoba, capital of Córdoba Province in Argentina. As of 2006, there were a few kilometers unfinished between the access road to the Taravella (Córdoba) Airport and Provincial Route E53) and the Chateau Carreras football stadium.

Administration
This road belongs to the Córdoba Road Network (Red de Accesos a Córdoba), which was given in concession to the Caminos de las Sierras company in November 1997 with a 25-year contract. It is the only road in the network that does not have toll booths.

References

External links
 Caminos de las Sierras Highway concession company.

National roads in Córdoba Province, Argentina
Tourism in Argentina